Apispiralia albocincta is a species of sea snail, a marine gastropod mollusk in the family Mangeliidae.

Description
The moderately solid shell is reddish brown, with a rather broad white band on the middle of the body whorl, visible on the spire. The outer lip is thickened and dentate within.

Distribution
This marine species is endemic to Australia and occurs off New South Wales

References

 Angas G.F. (1871) Description of thirty-four new species of shells from Australia. Proceedings of the Zoological Society of London, 1871: 13–21, pl. 1
  Hedley, C. 1922. A revision of the Australian Turridae. Records of the Australian Museum 13(6): 213-359, pls 42-56 
 Laseron, C. 1954. Revision of the New South Wales Turridae (Mollusca). Australian Zoological Handbook. Sydney : Royal Zoological Society of New South Wales 1-56, pls 1-12.

External links
  Tucker, J.K. 2004 Catalog of recent and fossil turrids (Mollusca: Gastropoda). Zootaxa 682:1-1295.

albocincta
Gastropods described in 1871
Gastropods of Australia